The 1969–70 Duke Blue Devils men's basketball team represented Duke University in the 1969–70 NCAA University Division men's basketball season. The head coach was Bucky Waters and the team finished the season with an overall record of 17–9 and did not qualify for the NCAA tournament.

References

Duke Blue Devils men's basketball seasons
Duke
Duke
1969 in sports in North Carolina
1970 in sports in North Carolina